Frain is a surname. Notable people with the surname include:

David Frain (born 1962), an English footballer
James Frain (born 1968), an English actor
John Frain (born 1968), an English footballer, brother of Peter
Peter Frain, an English footballer, brother of John
Rose Frain, a British artist
Todd Frain (born 1962), an American football player

See also
Darren DeFrain (born 1967), an American author